Live from Toronto may refer to:
Live from Toronto (Everclear album)
Live from Toronto (The Who album)